Les Sables-Blancs halt (French: Halte des Sables-Blancs) is a railway halt situated at the entrance to the Quiberon peninsula in the commune of  Plouharnel, Morbihan department of Brittany, France. The halt is located at kilometric point (KP) 601.710 on the Auray–Quiberon railway. The station is served by TER Bretagne services operated by the SNCF, between Auray and Quiberon (summer only).

History 
In 2018, the SNCF recorded 225 passenger movements at the halt.

References

External links
 Auray-Quiberon timetable

TER Bretagne
Railway stations in France opened in 1985
Railway stations in Morbihan